Franklinton Middle School is a public school for secondary education located in Franklinton, North Carolina, United States. It occupies the same building as did Franklinton High School from 1924 though 2011 before a new high school building was constructed outside of town in order to ease overcrowding. This school currently serves grades 6 through 8 for students residing in the Franklinton area. The building was closed for renovations from late 2011 through much of 2013. Middle school students attended Cedar Creek Middle School in nearby Youngsville during that time. It reopened as Franklinton Middle School for classes on August 26, 2013.

There are specialty buildings, including the science and music wings, located directly behind the main building. The gymnasium and sports fields are at a separate location just off the northwest corner of Vine and North Cheatham streets within short walking distance from the school.

History 
Franklinton Public School was built in 1923 to house all grade levels, replacing the much smaller and inadequate Franklinton Graded School on the north end of town which was only 17 years old at the time. It was a gift to the Town of Franklinton from Samuel C. Vann, founder and original owner of the historic Sterling Cotton Mill which is also located in Franklinton. Franklinton Public School first opened to students on September 11, 1924. The main building is three stories. When built, the first floor was originally used as the elementary school, the second was the middle school, and the third was used as the high school. The lower grades were moved to the former B.F. Person-Albion High School in 1969, now Franklinton Elementary School, when schools were fully integrated. It previously provided education for African-American students. Franklinton Public School was renamed Franklinton High School.

Demographics
Student Demographics: 255 Students Enrolled

37% Black, 34% White, 20% Hispanic, 9% Two or More Races

1999 fire 
Fire broke out at the school during the night of August 26, 1999, causing significant damage to three rooms on the first floor including a guidance office. The building was closed to students for four days while debris cleanup was taking place. These rooms involved were remodeled over the summer before the start of the school year. It is believed that an electrical problem may have started the fire.

Unique feature 
Primary stairwells between floors are on each side of the main building as with typical old style schools, but a unique feature on this one is that the middle landings between flights are actually outside instead of inside. On the higher floors, students would go up or down one flight of stairs and through a door to an outside covered balcony. They would walk through a second door to get to the other flight of stairs and continue on to the next floor. Other stairways are at the main entrance landing between the lower two floors and in the auditorium from the theater floor to the upper balcony. There is also an elevator on the south side of the building.

See also 
 Franklin County Schools

References 

 Franklinton High School; Town of Franklinton (1992). A Walk Through History: A Town Called Franklinton Celebrates Its 150th. Edited by Cheryl Faye Hollar. Cypress Creek Publications. Library of Congress Card Catalog #92-003897.
 Franklinton Middle School website. Franklinton Middle School: Credits, Retrieved Oct. 18, 2014.
 The Franklin Times: Back to School 2013. Franklinton Middle School: Credits, Retrieved Oct. 18, 2014.
 WRAL: Fire Closes Franklinton High School Indefinitely (August 26, 1999). Franklinton Middle School: Credits, Retrieved Oct. 27, 2014.
 WRAL: Franklinton High School to Reopen After Fire (August 28, 1999). Franklinton Middle School: Credits, Retrieved Oct. 27, 2014.

External links 
 Franklinton Middle School (Official Website)

Public middle schools in North Carolina
Schools in Franklin County, North Carolina